Globalvia is a Spanish multinational transport infrastructure company that operates in 11 countries across three continents. In June 2022, Globalvia in partnership with Kinetic Group launched a take over bid for the British bus and rail operator Go-Ahead Group. The sale was approved by Go-Ahead's shareholders in August 2022. Globalvia has a 49% shareholding.

Globalvia is owned by OPTrust, PGGM and USS who bought Globalvia in a takeover bid worth Euro 420 million in 2015.

History 
In 2007 Fomento de Construcciones y Contratas (FCC) and Caja Madrid  founded Globivia to unite their shared infrasturce assets under one brand with FCC and Caja Madrid each controlling a 50% stake in the new company.

2008 Globalvia won the private international tender to acquire two highways in Chile and was also awarded a contract in Portugal to build and operate the Transmontana, thus beginning the company's expansion outside of Spain.

The company continued to expand its road infrasturce investments over the years and in 2013 expanded into the rail industry with the purchase of Metro de Sevilla, a light rail system in Seville, Spain. Later that year, Globalvia expanded into Ireland by being awarded a contract managing and operate a 161 highway in Dublin.

In 2015 OPTrusts, Stichting Pensioenfonds Zorg en Welzijn (PGGM) and Universities Superannuation Scheme (USS) purchased Globalvia for a total of Euro 420 million.

December 2016 the company entered the United States by successfully securing the purchase of Pocahontas Parkway located in Richmond, Virginia.

In 2020 the company founded, Openvia to focus on technology and innovation platforms such as Tap&Go, Slora by Globalvia and Meep Sevilla.

In 2022 Globalvia in partnership with Australian based multinational bus operator, Kinetic Group, it purchased a 49% stake in the  Go-Ahead Group. Based in the United Kingdom, Go-Ahead operates buses and railway services in the UK, Singapore, Germany, Ireland and Norway.

Operations 
Globalvia operates a number of road infrastructure projects listed below, all of its public transport assets outside of Spain are part of Go-Ahead Group.:

Chile 

 Autopista Costa Arauco 
 Autopista del Aconcagua
 Autopista del Itata
 Autopista Vespucio Norte
 Túnel de San Cristóbal

Ireland 

 Globalvia Jons
 M50 Concession
 N6

United States 

 Pocahontas Parkway

Spain 

 Autopista Central Gallega
 Iryo, a high-speed rail operator
 Concesiones de Madrid
 M-407
 Metro Barajas (Metro de Madrid Line 8)
 Metro de Sevilla
 Metros Ligeros de Madrid
 Ruta de los Pantanos
 Tramvia Metropolità (Barcelona light rail)
 Metro de Madrid Line 9
 Metro Ligero (Light Rail)
 Tranvía de Parla
 AG-55 Autoestradas de Galicia
 AG-57 Autoestradas de Galicia
 AP-15 Audenasa
 AP-66 Aucalsa
 AP-9 Audasa

Portugal 

 Beira Interior
 Transmontana

Costa Rica 

 Ruta 27

United Kingdom 

Through its 49% shareholding in the Go-Ahead Group (UK-based) Globalvia operates public transport networks in the UK, Singapore and Ireland, and railway services in the United Kingdom, Norway and Germany.

References

Spanish companies established in 2007
Transport companies established in 2007